Maungaturoto is a  high basaltic scoria cone, in the Kaikohe-Bay of Islands volcanic field in New Zealand. It was the site of a pā.

References

Geological Society of New Zealand

Volcanoes of the Northland Region
Far North District